Tellef  "Tell" Wagle (16 July 1883 – 2 December 1957) was a Norwegian sailor who competed in the 1920 Summer Olympics. He was a crew member of the Norwegian boat Irene, which won the gold medal in the 8 metre class (1907 rating).

References

1883 births
1957 deaths
Norwegian male sailors (sport)
Sailors at the 1920 Summer Olympics – 8 Metre
Olympic sailors of Norway
Olympic gold medalists for Norway
Olympic medalists in sailing
Medalists at the 1920 Summer Olympics